Balta bicolor is a type of cockroach from the genus Balta.

References

Blattodea
Cockroaches